Jangareddygudem is a mandal in Eluru district in the state of Andhra Pradesh in India.

Demographics
According to Indian census, total population of Jangareddygudem Mandal is 109,814 living in 29,820 Houses, it has  villages. Of which Males are 54,682 and Females are 55,132.

Towns and villages
 census, the mandal has  villages. The settlements in the mandal are listed below:

References

Mandals in Eluru district